The 1984 Arkansas State Indians football team represented Arkansas State University as a member of the Southland Conference during the 1984 NCAA Division I-AA football season. Led by sixth-year head coach Larry Lacewell, the Indians compiled an overall record of 8–4–1 with a mark of 4–1–1 in conference play, placing second in the Southland. Arkansas State advanced to the NCAA Division I-AA Football Championship playoffs, where they defeated Chattanooga in the first round and lost to Montana State in the quarterfinals.

Schedule

References

Arkansas State
Arkansas State Red Wolves football seasons
Arkansas State Indians football